Edgewood Creative Thinking Through STEAM Magnet School is a STEAM magnet school located in New Haven, Connecticut. The school teaches kindergarten through eighth grade, and the principal is Shanta Smith. Edgewood was the first school redone in the New Haven school renovation project. There are approximately 450 students who attend the school.

External links
Edgewood School's Website

References

Schools in New Haven, Connecticut